Sean Harris (born 1965/1966) is an English actor and writer. He played Ian Curtis in 24 Hour Party People (2002), Micheletto Corella in The Borgias (2011–2013), Fifield in Prometheus (2012), Solomon Lane in Mission: Impossible – Rogue Nation (2015) and Mission: Impossible – Fallout (2018), Philip in Possum (2018), William Gascoigne in The King (2019) and Henry Peter Teague / Peter Morley in The Stranger (2022).

Harris won a British Academy Television Award for Best Actor for his role in the miniseries Southcliffe (2013) and received three consecutive nominations for the BIFA Award for Best Supporting Actor.

Early life and education
Harris was born just outside Woodbridge, Suffolk, and grew up in Lowestoft, Suffolk. He attended Denes High School, now the Ormiston Denes Academy in Lowestoft, Suffolk. At 23, he moved to London to train at the Drama Centre London from 1989 to 1992.

 Career 
 Stage 
Harris was a member of the Glasgow Citizens Theatre, where he performed in stage productions such as Tybalt in Romeo and Juliet directed by Giles Havergal and as Carino in Don Juan directed by Robert David MacDonald.  He also appeared as Lysander in a production of A Midsummer Night's Dream, directed by Matthew Lloyd at the Haymarket Theatre (Leicester) and as Johnny in a Nottingham Playhouse production of Angels Rave On, directed by Jonathan Church.

 Television 
Harris' television credits include serial killer Ian Brady, on ITV1's television mini-series, See No Evil: The Moors Murders (2006), the 2007 television films  Wedding Belles, Channel 4's drama series Cape Wrath (Meadowlands in the United States) as Gordon Ormond and the BBC series Ashes to Ashes as Arthur Layton.

In 2009, he played corrupt Detective Inspector Bob Craven in Channel 4's critically acclaimed Red Riding trilogy, and as photographer Anton Blair in Dean Cavanagh's comedy series, Svengali.

In the BBC TV drama Five Daughters (2010), Harris portrayed Brian Tobin, co-founder of the drug treatment facility, The Iceni Project, based in Suffolk. In preparing to play Tobin, Harris followed the real Brian Tobin around during pre-production.

From 2011 to 2013, Harris appeared as the assassin Micheletto in The Borgias, a series created by Neil Jordan. In 2013, he starred as Stephen Morton in the Channel 4 drama Southcliffe, for which Harris would win a British Academy of Film and Television Arts award for Best Actor in 2014. He also played Joss Merlyn in the poorly received BBC adaptation of Jamaica Inn, which became a subject of controversy and made national news over its mumbling cast and other sound problems.

 Film 
Harris played the main cast role of Thomas the Disciple, and later Thomas the Apostle in the 1999 biblical, historical, drama television film Jesus. His notable roles include that of Joy Division's lead singer Ian Curtis in Michael Winterbottom's 2002 film 24 Hour Party People and as Steven in the film short True Love (Once Removed), directed by Kevin Thomas. The film won Best Short Film at both the Palm Springs and Houston Film Festivals, was selected for the Clermont-Ferrand, London Raindance and Los Angeles Short Film festivals and also qualified for an Oscar nomination in 2004.

Harris also played Nick Sidney in the 2005 mockumentary Brothers of the Head, directed by Keith Fulton and Louis Pepe. In 2007, he appeared in his first feature film lead role as Eddie in Saxon, directed by Greg Loftin. In 2009, he played Stretch in Harry Brown, directed by Daniel Barber.

In 2010, Harris appeared in another film short, Native Son, written and directed by Scottish director Scott Graham. It premiered at the 2010 Cannes Film Festival.

In 2012, he played Fifield in Ridley Scott's Prometheus.

In 2014, Harris played Mick Santino in Deliver Us From Evil (2014), directed by Scott Derrickson and based upon the 2001 novel "Beware the Night" by Ralph Sarchie and Lisa Collier Cool.  He was cast by Derrickson for the film, without an interview, based upon the director having seen the actor's performance in Harry Brown. That same year, he appeared as Gene Womack in Guy Myhill's The Goob.  Myhill previously directed Harris in two film shorts, Two Halftimes to Hell (1997) and The Fabulous Bilsons (2001).  Harris finished the year with his performances as Captain Sandy Browning in '71, directed by Yann Demange, for which he earned a 2014 British Independent Film Award nomination for Best Supporting Actor, he starred Campbell in Serena (2014), directed by Susanne Bier.

In 2015, Harris appeared as Solomon Lane in Mission: Impossible – Rogue Nation, directed by Christopher McQuarrie, and as Macduff in Justin Kurzel's Macbeth earning another BIFA nomination. In 2016, he starred in the crime drama Trespass Against Us, in a cast that included Michael Fassbender, Brendan Gleeson, and Rory Kinnear. His in the film performance meriting a third BIFA nomination in a row. He reprised his role as Lane in the sequel Mission: Impossible – Fallout (2018).

Harris filmed Possum in 2016, a film by Matthew Holness, in which he plays the main character. 

In 2021, Harris portrayed Darren McGrady, the Royal Head Chef, in the film Spencer, and a frail, aged King Arthur in the film The Green Knight.

 Music videos 
Harris made a cameo appearance as a clown in a music video for the Norwich band the Black Sharks' debut album titled Lose Control, directed by Myhill (evidently filmed at the same time as The Fabulous Bilsons).

In 2007, he appeared in a video for Mark Ronson's "Stop Me".

In 2012, Harris appeared in London-based music group Barbarossa's video short, Battles, directed by Montserrat Lombard. Harris and Lombard have been working on the screen play for a film short, White as well as a script for a feature-length film, Imager''.

Filmography

Film

Television

Awards and nominations

References

External links
 

20th-century English male actors
21st-century English male actors
English male film actors
English male television actors
Living people
Male actors from Suffolk
People from Woodbridge, Suffolk
Best Actor BAFTA Award (television) winners
Alumni of the Drama Centre London
Year of birth missing (living people)